Nazarovka is a rural locality (a selo) and the administrative center of Nazarovsky Selsoviet of Mikhaylovsky District, Altai Krai, Russia. The population was 540 in 2016. There are 6 streets.

Geography 
Nazarovka is located 26 km north of Mikhaylovskoye (the district's administrative centre) by road. Poluyamki is the nearest rural locality.

References 

Rural localities in Mikhaylovsky District, Altai Krai